Gégé Kizubanata (born 12 May 1981) is a Congolese basketball player who last played for Espoir Fukash. He also played for the DR Congo national basketball team in his career.

Early life
In 2002, Kizubanata joined the "Africa 100 Camp" in South Africa (now Basketball Without Borders). From there, he was scouted by Angolan team Atlético Sport Aviação.

Kizubanata has also played for (Angola) and Stade Nabeulien (Tunisia).

National team career
He represented the DR Congo at the 2007 FIBA Africa Championship, where he scored 24 points and grabbed 18 rebounds in 79 minutes over 4 games.

See also
DR Congo national basketball team

References

1981 births
Living people
Basketball players from Kinshasa
Democratic Republic of the Congo men's basketball players
Stade Nabeulien basketball players
BC Espoir Fukash players
ASB Mazembe players
21st-century Democratic Republic of the Congo people